Davide Sorrenti (July 9, 1976 – February 4, 1997) was an Italian fashion photographer, son of photographer and advertiser Francesca Sorrenti, and brother of Mario Sorrenti (born 1971) and Vanina Sorrenti (born 1973), also fashion photographers.

Early life
Davide Sorrenti was born 1976 in Naples, Italy, in a family of talented photographers (unofficially they have become known as the Corleones of fashion photography); his mother Francesca Sorrenti, renowned fashion photographer, as well as his five-year older brother Mario; and his sister Vanina, (after his death) also proved to be a talented photographer.

The Sorrentis moved to New York in the early 1980s, partly because Davide Sorrenti had thalassemia (or Cooley's anemia, a hereditary form of anemia), and needed regular blood transfusions and medical care; a burden that is believed to at least partially have caused him to take comfort in drugs. The disease made him look several years younger than his real age. His brother Mario documented his sufferings one of many nights, published in the book The machine; referring to the drug infusion pump that Davide was hooked up to.

Growing up in a cultivated environment, Sorrenti painted, played golf and liked opera, but he soon also became a "prep-school gangster"; private-school students living a wannabee gangster's life, with shoplifting, credit-card scams and drug dealing as a way of gaining status. He also started the crew SKE while attending Bayard Rustin High School for the Humanities, with fellow skateboarders and graffiti artists (Davide's tag was Argue); with whom he formed a rap group called the Mosaics, because of their wide mix of ethnicities; and started the streetwear label Danücht.

Career

Early work
Sorrenti began documenting his friends in their everyday actions at the age of 18, developing his own distinctive personal style and sense of fashion. Around age 19, his darkly glamorous photos appeared in magazines like Interview, Detour, and Ray Gun. With his talent, charm, and juvenile good looks, he quickly became New York's fashion Wunderkind, boosting the heroin chic-trend with young skinny waif-models appearing as drug addicts.

Heroin Chic
Inspired by the real-life subjects of the photojournalism of Larry Clark in the 1960s and Nan Goldin in the 1970s, photographers like Juergen Teller, Craig McDean, David Sims and Terry Richardson reacted against the “phony and over-retouched” aesthetics of 1980s glamour, introducing what they thought was a more truthful approach to reality in the early 1990s. Having started as an underground trend, the approach soon went mainstream when more commercial photographers started copying the style, and with the long running campaign of Calvin Klein featuring models like Kate Moss and Vincent Gallo.

Davide's career started almost as soon as he learned how to handle a camera in 1994. His mother Francesca recalls that every day was a photo shoot for Davide. He documented everything he and his friends did, making them feel that something big was about to happen. In a series of snapshots published in Interview 1996, his friends from SKE are portrayed hanging out in a run-down apartment, watching TV and smoking pot. His photos also got published in magazines like Detour, Surface, Ray Gun and i-D, all of them proponents of heroin chic, and shot campaign photos for the Japanese fashion companies Hysteric Glamour and Matsuda.

Davide's girlfriend at the time, fashion model Jaime (a.k.a. James) King, had been the subject of a cover story in The New York Times Magazine, where she admitted getting involved in drugs when she started modeling at age 14. One of Davide's photos shows a young, skinny Jamie lying on a bed, with torn clothes surrounded with photos of famous drug casualties like Kurt Cobain, Sid Vicious, and Jerry Garcia of Grateful Dead.

Death and aftermath
On February 4, 1997, Davide died of a kidney ailment, possibly because he had not received a blood transfusion in the last few months before his death, although autopsies were incomplete.

As a reaction to her son's death, Francesca Sorrenti started a campaign against the glamourization of drug addiction and underage models, demanding magazine editors to take responsibility. “Heroin chic isn't what we're projecting. It's what we are. Our business has become heroin chic. Someone taking pictures of that magnitude has to have experienced hard drugs”, Ms. Sorrenti stated in The New York Times.

Matt Jones, photographer and son of i-D editor Terry Jones, said of his friend Davide: “I guess he did slightly see the glamorous side. He also saw the real side of it. And he glamorized it himself, which is the sad thing. It was a whole circle. He glamorized it, and got caught up in it a bit.”

In May 1997, U.S. President Bill Clinton denounced the American fashion industry for cynically abusing teenagers and helping spread heroin usage to a new and younger group of people. “Some fashion leaders are admitting flat-out that images projected in fashion photos in the last few years have made heroin addiction seem glamorous and sexy and cool," President Clinton stated. “And as some of the people in those images start to die now, it's become obvious that is not true. The glorification of heroin is not creative, it's destructive. It's not beautiful, it is ugly. And this is not about art, it's about life and death. And glorifying death is not good for any society."

Davide Sorrenti's death caused the fashion industry to declare heroin chic improper and passé, and by summer 1997 a new healthy look was introduced on its magazine spreads. Jaime King went to rehabilitation the following year for her addictions to heroin and alcohol.

Revival
In November 2018 filmmaker Charles Curran released a documentary film called See Know Evil on the life, work and death of David Sorrenti.  "[The] film is partly about telling the story of his life, partly about trying to present a balanced reappraisal of his work."  David's work is intertwined with his friends and youthful exploits.
November 2019 Francesca Sorrenti, David's mother, released Davide Sorrenti ArgueSKE 1994–1997, a retrospective of his work.

References

Italian emigrants to the United States
Fashion photographers
Commercial photographers
Photographers from New York City
American portrait photographers
1976 births
1997 deaths
Deaths from kidney disease